The Turquoise Lament (1973) is the fifteenth novel in the Travis McGee series by John D. MacDonald. It focuses on McGee's involvement with an old acquaintance, Pidge, who believes her husband Howie Brindle is trying to kill her to acquire her considerable inheritance. It takes place primarily in Hawaii and other Pacific Rim islands, particularly American Samoa.

References
 
 

1973 American novels
Travis McGee (novel series)
Novels set in Hawaii
Novels set in Oceania